Philip Pocock is the name of:

Philip Pocock (artist) (born 1954), Canadian artist and author
Philip Pocock (1906–1984), Roman Catholic bishop of Toronto
Philip Pocock Catholic Secondary School, Ontario, Canada